Grammar-based codes or Grammar-based compression are compression algorithms based on the idea of constructing a context-free grammar (CFG) for the string to be compressed. Examples include universal lossless data compression algorithms. To compress a data sequence , a grammar-based code transforms  into a context-free grammar .
The problem of finding a smallest grammar for an input sequence (smallest grammar problem) is known to be NP-hard, so many grammar-transform algorithms are proposed from theoretical and practical viewpoints.
Generally, the produced grammar  is further compressed by statistical encoders like arithmetic coding.

Examples and characteristics 
The class of grammar-based codes is very broad. It includes block codes, the multilevel pattern matching (MPM) algorithm, variations of the incremental parsing Lempel-Ziv code, and many other new universal lossless compression algorithms.
Grammar-based codes are universal in the sense that they can achieve asymptotically the entropy rate of any stationary, ergodic source with a finite alphabet.

Practical algorithms 
The compression programs of the following are available from external links.

 Sequitur is a classical grammar compression algorithm that sequentially translates an input text into a CFG, and then the produced CFG is encoded by an arithmetic coder.
 Re-Pair is a greedy algorithm using the strategy of most-frequent-first substitution. The compressive performance is powerful, although the main memory space requirement is very large.
 GLZA, which constructs a grammar that may be reducible, i.e., contain repeats, where the entropy-coding cost of "spelling out" the repeats is less than the cost creating and entropy-coding a rule to capture them. (In general, the compression-optimal SLG is not irreducible, and the Smallest Grammar Problem is different from the actual SLG compression problem.)

See also
 Dictionary coder
Grammar induction
 Straight-line grammar

References

External links
GLZA discussion and paper
Description of grammar-based codes with example
Sequitur codes 
Re-Pair codes
Re-Pair codes a version of Gonzalo Navarro.
GrammarViz 2.0 - implementation of Sequitur, Re-Pair, and parallel Re-Pair in Java.

Data compression
Coding theory
Information theory